Naif Ahmad Hazazi (born 27 July 1988), also nicknamed Al Saqr which means The Falcon, is a Saudi Arabian professional footballer, who plays as a striker former the Saudi Arabia national team.

Personal life
Hazazi lives in Jeddah. He used to be engaged to Yemeni singer Balqees Ahmed Fathi. However, they are no longer engaged.

Career

Al-Ittihad
Naif began his career at the Al-Ittihad he was playing for the Al-Ittihad Under-17, but because his forward talent, the Belgian coach Dimitri Davidovic included him to the first team, He Received an offer from Club Sevilla when he was at International travels, about admiration for his performance, But the deal failed to reject the coach Manuel Jose to keep him with the team.

2006–08
Hazazi was promoted to the first team in 2006. On 25 January 2007, he made his debut with the first team against Al Nassr in the Prince Faisal Cup.

On 1 December 2007, Hazazi made his league debut as a late-match substitute against Al-Hilal. Against Syrian Ittihad-Aleppo, he scored the second goal by head in the 42nd minute. The match ended 3–0 in favor of Al-Ittihad.

2008–09 season
Upon Hamzah's departure from the club, Hazazi inherited his number 9 jersey. During the 2008-09 season, Hazazi established himself as a regular first team player. Hazazi usually entered as a reserve player, On 12 October, First match for Hazazi as a key player. He scored the first goal in the match against Al-Shabab en route to a 2–1 victory. Hazazi caused of first goal in the game by assist to Hicham Aboucherouane to score against Al-Ahli. Emerged his skills, especially, when he scored 2 goals against Al-Watani in a 7–2 victory.  Hazazi also scored the second goal in the 43rd minute against Al-Shabab in a 4–0 win.

On 12 April, the final match for Al-Ittihad on the season versus Al-Hilal, Hazazi opened match with one goal in the 18th minute and finished 2–1. He won his first title league with Al-Ittihad. On 11 May in an away Champions Cup-match, he scored one goal against Al-Hazm as the only goal in the match to make the difference 1–0. On 15 May, he played against Al-Shabab without help to make the victory. He lost 0–4 from Al-Shabab. Hazazi Replaced Renato on AFC Champions League match against Esteghlal. He also played against Al-Jazira, He played against Umm-Salal SC full match and he scored a hat-trick of 7–0. Round of 16, he played against Al-Shabab, He making the ball to teammate Hicham Aboucherouane to Ssore the second goal in the game.

2009–10 season

He played twice games without any goal. On 26 August, he played against Al-Qadasiya and scored hat-trick on 7–1 won, to become the second hat-trick in his history. Hazazi has been injured in this season by cruciate ligament. On 28 April, was the comeback match against Zob Ahan, and entered as a substitute in the second half after its improved. On 3 May, Hazazi entered as a reserve on the late minutes, he scored a goal to converted to beat Al-Shabab on last 10 minutes. He played also on the final as a reserve against Al-Hilal he won his first title Champions Cup by penalties finished 5–4.

2010–11 season
In the 2010–11 season, Hazazi scored 12 in 22 matches in the league, In all completions scoring 18 in 39 matches, including 6 matches without any goal in Champions League. On 14 August 2010, Hazazi scored his first goal for the season against Al-Ettifaq, with a strange shot passed through the goalkeeper hands. He scored against Najran SC on Round 4. On 29 August, Hazazi make the third hat-trick in his history against Al-Hazm in a 4–0 won, He assist the 4th goal. He assists the first goal against Al-Ahli, Hazazi replaced in the second half and entered Mohammed Noor because of injury influence. Hazazi played against Al-Raed, He scored the first goal after a powerful shot from outside the penalty area. ended 2-1. Hazazi scored the only goal of his team against Al-Qadasiya and scored another goal correctly ruled out for offside. He scored 2 goals on a match against Al-Shabab but the match ended 2–2. He played against Al Nassr and received the red card before match end, His response was a smile on referee. Hazazi played as a reserve against Al-Faisaly, This is the first time on the season plays as a reserve. He played against Al-Raed, he scored the first goal and caused a penalty kick will be the third goal, that Mabrouk Zaid scored it. Played against Al-Wahda, he scored the second goal to make it 2–1. On 15 May, he played the last match of the season against Al-Shabab, Hazazi assist to Mohammed Noor to score the first goal, match is ended 1–1. On Champions Cup. He assist the tie-goal, by passing to Mohammed Al-Rashid against Al Nassr on away. On Home-match, he scored the tie-goal and qualifying goal. He scored against Al-Hilal a tie-goal, ended 1–1. Hazazi played on the final as a reserve against Al-Ahli, he lost the final by penalties 2–4.

2011–12 season
Hazazi began his season with 2 goals against Al-Ansar, scored two goals, and hat-trick goal was canceled. In an ACL home match against Jeonbuk Motors FC, he scored two goals in the first 20 minutes. He lost 3–2. In Away, Hazazi received a red card by the referee in the first minutes. He lost 5–3 in aggregate to Jeonbuk Motors FC. against Al-Shabab, He score the second goal from a penalty. He plays against Al Fateh with a loss 1–2. in Jeddah derby, he lost 3–1 from Al Ahli. Hazazi score the second goal against Al Nasser to win 3–1 in Riyadh, in Away against Al Hilal, score goal from header in last minutes in the second half, to change the match to tie. After landing for the first time this season to sixth place, Hazazi called Ittihad Jeddah to sign his brother Ibrahim to club, who plays for Al Ahli. the supporters of the club criticized Hazazi career by problem called Fasting of the scoring, After he moved away from score in the league and competitions. the goal against Al-Faisaly was the comeback goal, Hazazi celebrated after Went bad luck with him. Hazazi scored his first historical goal against Al Ahli, and was the only goal in the game and the winning goal, which caused move Al Ahli away from top of the league. On 20 March 2012, He score two goals against Al-Arabi and received a yellow card for Get out from the stadium and celebrate with club supporters. On 2 May 2012, Hazazi broke Hamza Idris record in Asian Tournaments when he scored his 10th goal against Pakhtakor. Hazazi confirmed the difficulty of the game and said:

On 23 May 2012, He played against Persepolis with a 3–0 won, he scored the first goal from penalty kick, which caused by teammate Faouzi. and also was injured during the match which he continued the match to the 60th minute till he has been substituted, the tests results proved that injury is a broke of his nose that keep him away for two months.

International career
Naif made his international debut at the age of 19, in a friendly against Thailand and score the first goal in his international career in 65th minute. Hazazi also scored two goals in a 4–0 friendly win over Bahrain. On 30 August 2009, he played a friendly match against Malaysia and injured his cruciate ligament, which kept him out of action for a period of time.

2010 World Cup qualification
He was part of the 2010 Saudi Qualification squad. He appeared in the fourth round in the tournament with Malek Mouath and Yasser Al-Qahtani. Hazazi was able to be in the starting line-up after coach Jose Peseiro decided to rule out Al Qahtani for the qualifiers against Iran and the United Arab Emirates for disciplinary reasons. Al Qahtani's loss was Hazazi's gain, However, the youngster able to make his second qualifying appearance in Tehran against Iran. With only 11 minutes remaining, Hazazi calmly converted the equaliser that ignited one of his country's most famous comebacks in a 2–1 victory. On 1 April 2009 against United Arab Emirates in Riyadh, Saudis were again trailing in the second half and, despite gaining a fortuitous equaliser through an own goal, Hazazi was a symbol of luck to qualify before the end of the match five minutes with the Winning Golden Header.

2011 AFC Asian Cup
On 9 January 2011, Hazazi in first official match in Asian competition in 1–2 loss against Syria, he entered in 56th minute as substitute in bad experience. He tried to help the attack to score but couldn't against Jordan with a 0–1 loss. in the third match, Motaz Al Mosa came on as a substitute for Naif in the 46th minute, Hazazi apologized for ignoring the sports channels after the end of the game with Japan which ended 0–5 loss.

2015 AFC Asian Cup
Hazazi was included in Cosmin Olăroiu's final squad for 2015 AFC Asian Cup, ruling as central forward after the injury of 2014 Asian Footballer of the Year Nasser Al-Shamrani. He started Saudi Arabia's opening match against China, missing from a penalty kick in the 62nd minute as the Saudis lost 1–0. In the team's second match, Hazazi scored the equalising goal in an eventual 4–1 victory over North Korea.

Style of play
 
Hazazi's skills emerged at a young age and agree with major players skills. Hazazi has been compared to Chelsea striker Didier Drogba, has also been referred to as a classic centre forward, owing to his excellent heading ability, and his spirit. He is the symbol of the header throws, Dangerous in the air as his head more dangerous than his leg. He is very spirited footballer and also have a determination, have a good character. He always looking for the yellow card for the excite the fans after the goal. He has a special celebration is performed after the goal. He received a red card from the most famous accidents as he oppressed. It was one of the most famous ten cases the expulsion of the football history in Saudi Arabia.

Outside football
Hazazi was awarded Al-Riyadia's the most popular footballer. He signed a four-year deal with Nike in Dubai to appear in the first advertisement for Nike in the Middle East. Nike selected Hazazi based on his achievements with club and his country despite his young age. He has also signed other sponsorships with Soccertown and Red Bull on 31 May 2012.

He is known for his charitable work and became Arab Childhood Ambassador. He and the club owners visited the Abdulateef Jamil Hospital, making a tour of various hospital alongside Osama Al-Muwallad.

He also participated in a documentary film at King Abdulaziz University in Jeddah, about the dangers of smoking.

In October 2012, he got engaged to Yemeni-Emarati singer Balqees Ahmed Fathi.

Career statistics

Club

International

International goals

Under–23

Senior team
Scores and results list Saudi Arabia's goal tally first.

Career totals

Honours

Club
Al-Ittihad
Saudi Professional League: 2006–07, 2008–09
King Cup of Champions: 2010, 2013

Al-Shabab
King Cup of Champions: 2014 
Saudi Super Cup: 2014

Individual
 Saudi Forward of the Season: 2009
 Saudi Promising Player of the Year: 2009
 Most Popular Player in ME: 2010

References

External links
 

1989 births
Living people
Sportspeople from Jeddah
Saudi Arabian footballers
Association football forwards
Saudi Arabia international footballers
2011 AFC Asian Cup players
2015 AFC Asian Cup players
Saudi Professional League players
Ittihad FC players
Al-Shabab FC (Riyadh) players
Al Nassr FC players
Al-Taawoun FC players
Ohod Club players
Al-Adalah FC players
Liga I players
FC Botoșani players
Saudi Arabian expatriate footballers
Saudi Arabian expatriate sportspeople in Romania
Expatriate footballers in Romania